The Legion Sports Complex is a complex mainly used for soccer that is based in Wilmington, North Carolina, United States. It has multiple youth soccer fields where the Super Y-League club from the area plays and a 3,000 seater soccer-specific stadium called Legion Stadium. It is where the Wilmington Hammerheads of the United Soccer League and the W-League play.

Soccer venues in North Carolina
Baseball venues in North Carolina
Sports venues in Wilmington, North Carolina
Sports complexes in the United States